Forbes Taylor Kennedy (born August 18, 1935) is a Canadian former professional ice hockey player. He played 603 games National Hockey League (NHL) with five teams between 1956 and 1969, recording 70 goals and 108 assists for 178 points and 888 penalty minutes. He led the NHL in penalty minutes during the 1968–69 season. After his playing career ended Kennedy became a coach for several seasons.

Playing career
Kennedy was born 1935 in Dorchester, New Brunswick and raised in Prince Edward Island. Despite his small frame, he was often the most penalized player on the ice.

Forbes spent the following season with the WHL's San Francisco Seals before the team was relocated and renamed for absorption into the NHL, becoming the California Seals.

Kennedy's most infamous game was marked by a violent incident in the 1969 Stanley Cup playoffs in Boston, as teammate Pat Quinn delivered a massive hit to Bruins star Bobby Orr, knocking him unconscious. Kennedy responded to the incident by partaking in four fights before punching a linesman and getting ejected from the game. He received a lengthy suspension and his tenure with the Toronto Maple Leafs ended.

Post-playing career
After retiring, Kennedy began a long coaching career when he coached the Cape Breton Metros of the Maritime Junior A Hockey League in their first year of existence in 1969-70 then coached the Halifax Junior Canadians in 1970–71. He was brought in to coach the Summerside Crystals of the PEI Junior Hockey League in 1971-72 and 1972-73 before leaving for the Los Angeles Sharks of the WHA to try to resume his playing career. That did not work out for Kennedy due to injuries so he ended his playing career and went back to coaching with the Winston-Salem Polar Twins of the Southern Hockey League. Kennedy returned home a few years later to PEI and coached junior hockey for a number of years.

On January 16, 2012, Kennedy was honoured by the Summerside Western Capitals of the Maritime Junior Hockey League with a "Forbes Kennedy Night" and he was presented with a plaque in recognition of his service to the team that he coached from 2004 to 2007.

On November 24, 2019, at the Homburg Theatre of the Confederation Centre for the Arts in Charlottetown, PEI, Kennedy joined Prince Edward Island Symphony Orchestra (PEISO) Music Director Mark Shapiro to lead the PEISO and a concert audience in "O Canada."

Career statistics

Regular season and playoffs

References

External links
 

1935 births
Living people
Boston Bruins players
Buffalo Bisons (AHL) players
Canadian ice hockey centres
Chicago Blackhawks players
Detroit Red Wings players
Edmonton Flyers (WHL) players
Ice hockey people from New Brunswick
Ice hockey people from Prince Edward Island
Omaha Knights (CHL) players
Philadelphia Flyers players
San Francisco Seals (ice hockey) players
Southern Hockey League (1973–1977) coaches
Spokane Comets players
Toronto Maple Leafs players